Mussoorie is a hill station and a municipal board, near Dehradun city in the Dehradun district of the Indian state of Uttarakhand. The hill station is in the foothills of the Garhwal Himalayan range. The adjoining town of Landour, which includes a military cantonment, is considered part of "greater Mussoorie", as are the townships of Barlowganj and Jharipani.

To the northeast are the Himalayan snow ranges, and to the south, the Doon Valley and Shiwalik ranges. Mussoorie is popularly known as The Queen of the Hills.

In the recent years, Mussoorie has again gained popularity as an upcoming travel destination with many attractions such as Camel's back road, Dhanaulti, Lal Tibba, etc. Uttarakhand Government reported 3.02 million (30.23 Lacs) travelers to Mussoorie in 2019.

History

Mussoorie has long been known as Queen of the Hills. The town is often referred to as Mansuri by Indians.

In 1803 the Gorkhas under Umer Singh Thapa conquered the Garhwal and the Dehra, whereby Mussoorie was established. On 1 November 1814, a war broke out between the Gorkhas and the British. Dehradun and Mussoorie were evacuated by the Gorkhas by the year 1815 and were annexed to the district of Saharanpur by 1819.

Mussoorie as a resort was established in 1825 by Captain Young, a British military officer. With Mr Shore, the resident Superintendent of Revenues at Dehradun, he explored the present site and jointly constructed a shooting lodge. Lt. Frederick Young of the East India Company came to Mussoorie to shoot game. He built a hunting lodge (shooting box) on the Camel's Back Road, and became a magistrate of Doon in 1823. He raised the first Gurkha Regiment and planted the first potatoes in the valley. His tenure in Mussoorie ended in 1844, after which he served in Dimapur and Darjeeling, later retiring as a General and returning to Ireland. There are no memorials to commemorate Young in Mussoorie. However, there is a Young Road in Dehradun on which ONGC's Tel Bhawan stands.

In 1832, Mussoorie was the intended terminus of the Great Trigonometric Survey of India that began at the southern tip of the country. Although unsuccessful, the Surveyor General of India at the time, George Everest, wanted the new office of the Survey of India to be based in Mussoorie; a compromise location was Dehradun, where it remains. The same year the first beer brewery at Mussoorie was established by Sir Henry Bohle as "The Old Brewery". The brewery opened and closed twice before it was re-established by Sir John Mackinnon as Mackinnon & Co. in 1850.

By 1901, Mussoorie's population had grown to 6,461, rising to 15,000 in the summer.

The Nehru family, including Nehru's daughter Indira (later Indira Gandhi) were frequent visitors to Mussoorie in the 1920s, 1930s, and 1940s, and stayed at the Savoy Hotel. They also spent time in nearby Dehradun, where Nehru's sister Vijayalakshmi Pandit ultimately settled full-time.

On 20 April 1959, during the 1959 Tibetan Rebellion, the 14th Dalai Lama took up residence at Mussoorie, this until April 1960 when he relocated to Dharamsala in Himachal Pradesh, where the Central Tibetan Administration is today headquartered.

The first Tibetan school was established in Mussoorie in 1960. Tibetans settled mainly in Happy Valley. Today, about 5,000 Tibetans live in Mussoorie.

Geography and climate

Mussoorie has a fairly typical subtropical highland climate (Köppen Cwb) for the mid-altitude Himalaya. The pre-monsoon seasons in April and May is warm and generally dry and clear, giving way to heavy rainfall from mid-June, while the post-monsoon season is also dry and clear but substantially cooler. In winter, rainfall is a little more frequent than in the pre-and post-monsoon seasons, and the general weather cool and partly cloudy. Mussoorie usually receives a few spells of snowfall in December, January and February, although the number of snowy days has come down in recent years due to a combination of local and global factors, such as deforestation, construction activity and global warming. Between October to February the town shows the rare "winterline" phenomenon.

Government
The Mussoorie Municipal Council is the civic or urban local body that governs the city. It is essentially the city government and differs from the MDDA (Mussoorie Dehradun Development Board), which is a state run organisation.

This corporation consists of 13 wards and is headed by a Chairman who presides over a deputy chairman and 12 other corporators representing the wards. The Chairman is elected directly through a first-past-the-post voting system and the deputy chairman is elected by the corporators from among their numbers.

The Council is composed of elected officials like the mayor and corporators, administrative officials, like the Executive Officer and technical officers who have expertise in various domains.

Demographics
As of 2011 India census, Mussoorie had a population of 30,118. Males constitute 55% of the population and females 45%. Mussoorie has an average literacy rate of 89%, higher than the national average of 75%: male literacy is 94%, and female literacy is 84%. In Mussoorie, 9% of the population is under 6 years of age. In Mussoorie Nagar Palika Parishad, female sex ratio is of 812 against the state average of 963. Moreover, the child sex ratio in Mussoorie is around 918 compared to Uttarakhand state average of 890.

Landmarks

Tourism, concentrated during summer and winter, is the most significant segment of the Mussoorie economy.

Bhadraj Temple
Bhadraj Temple is a famous temple in Yamuna Valley. It is dedicated to Lord Balram (brother of Sri Krishna). People visit here to go trekking and for camping. Greenfield is a safe place for camping here. There are views of the Chaukhamba and Banderpunch peaks.

Dhanaulti
The Doon Valley and snow-covered Garhwal Himalayas can be viewed from there.

Camel's Back Road
Camel's Back Road incorporates a nature walk. The road, which takes its name from a rocky outcrop in the shape of a camel's hump, contains hotels, motels, and a cemetery. The oldest Christian church in the Himalayas, St Mary's, is above Mall Road.

Lal Tibba
Lal Tibba earlier was at the highest peak of Mussoorie where presently TV Tower is located. The earlier Lal Tibba peak had a fixed large binocular through which one could see the snow clad peaks of Himalayas that lies to the north. After the construction of TV Tower the binocular was shifted on the Landour ridge towards west which is now named as Lal Tibba and is located near "Childer's Lodge".

Gun Hill

The cable car was constructed by the efforts of Mr. Hukam Singh Pawar when he was the Chairman, Mussoorie Municipal Board. At Gun Hill is a cannon previously used to sound midday time for the local inhabitants.. It is the second-highest spot after Lal Tibba.

Kempty Falls
The Britishers on their way to and from Mussoorie to Chakrata camped at the falls for tea and therefore the name Camp Tea became Kempty.

Lake Mist
About  before Kempty Falls on the Mussoorie-Kempty road is Lake Mist, through which flows the Kempty river with its numerous small waterfalls. The resort of Lake Mist provides accommodation, restaurant facilities and boating.

Municipal Garden
The Municipal Garden provides an artificial mini-lake with paddle boats.

Mussoorie Lake
The newly developed (1994) Mussoorie Lake was built by City Board and Mussoorie Dehradun Development Authority.

Bhatta Falls

Jharipani Fall
Jharipani Fall is on the Mussoorie-Jharipani road,  from Mussoorie.

Mossy Fall

Sir George Everest's House
At Park Estate are the remains of the building and laboratory of Sir George Everest, the Surveyor-General of India from 1830 to 1843. It is after George Everest that the world's highest peak Mt. Everest is named. The place provides a view of Doon Valley on one side and a panoramic view of the Aglar River valley and the peaks of the Himalayan ranges on the other.

Happy Valley

Happy Valley lies on the western side of Library Point. The tourist attraction includes Tibetan sanctuaries, a municipal garden, and the IAS Academy. Lal Tibba is a further tourist attraction in the cantonment of Landour near Mussoorie, and overlooks the Himalayas.

Nag Devta Temple
There is vehicular access to the temple, which provides a view of Mussoorie and the Doon Valley.

Jwalaji Temple (Benog Hill)
It is at the top of Benog Hill and contains an idol of the Goddess Durga; from the temple is a view of the valley of the Aglar River.

Cloud End
Cloud End is surrounded by thick deodar forest. The bungalow, built-in 1835 by a British major, was one of the first four buildings in Mussoorie and has been converted to a hotel.

Van Chetna Kendra
Van Chetna Kendra, a  sanctuary  to the south from Library Point, was established in 1993. It is significant for the extinct bird species Mountain Quail (Pahari Bater), last spotted in 1876.

Benog Wildlife Sanctuary

Mall Road
Mall Road, with architectural evidence of a colonial past, is a shopping area at the centre of Mussoorie, and contains shops, cafes, video game establishments, skating rinks, a nearby Tibetan market place, and a Methodist church. The Mall road starts from Picture Palace in the east to Library point towards the west.

Lal Tibba
A Japanese telescope, with views of Himalayan ranges including Badrinath, Kedarnath, Banderpunch, was installed at Lal Tibba in 1967.

Dalai HIlls Mussoorie

The Dalai Hills Mussoorie and Happy Valley are two of the most impressive and beautiful places in Mussoorie. It takes about 400 meters walk from the Tibetan temple in Happy Valley to reach

Soham Heritage and Art Centre 
Bala Hisar is a museum in Uttarakhand that showcases cultural heritage of the state in different art forms.

Education and services

There is a Christian institution called the Landour Community Hospital. It is a small mission hospital run by the Emmanuel Hospital Association, Delhi catering to the medical needs of the people on the hills for the last 75 years.

The schools include Convent of Jesus and Mary, Waverly (1845), St. George's College (1853), Woodstock School (1854), Oak Grove School (1888), Wynberg-Allen (1888), Guru Nanak Fifth Centenary (1969), and Convent of Jesus and Mary Hampton Court.

St. George's College, Mussoorie (founded in 1853) is amongst the oldest and most reputed schools in the country. It has been run by the Patrician Brothers since 1893. Over the years, its alumni have made distinguished contributions in several fields, especially in serving the armed forces of the nation. The school's imposing facade stands out as one of the main architectural attractions of Mussoorie.

Woodstock School is a Christian, international, co-educational, residential school in Landour, a small hill station contiguous with the town of Mussoorie, Uttarakhand, India. The school traces its origin to the 1850s when a group of English ladies were enlisted by British officers and American missionaries to provide a Protestant education for girls.

Woodstock is among the most well-known boarding schools of the Indian Subcontinent, said by some to be currently the best international school in India. (Others are the Kodaikanal International School and the Hebron School, Ooty, both in South India.) Classes at Woodstock begin from ECP (Early Childhood Program) and follow up to grade 12.

Oak Grove School stands out from the other notable institutions of Mussoorie for two reasons. First, it is affiliated with the CBSE, New Delhi, which is a rarity amongst the residential schools of Mussoorie. Second, it is a secular government-aided school, run by the Northern Railway. The school was founded in 1888 by the East Indian Railway (EIR) and passed to the Indian Railways when railways were nationalised after Independence. It has three semi-independent wings and is on two hills in Jharipani,  from Mussoorie town, near the famous Jharipani fall.

Wynberg Allen School, established in 1888, is a well-known school which ranks amongst the finest in the country. In Kanpur, during the year 1887, a group of friends, Mr. Alfred Powell, Mr. and Mrs. Arthur Foy and Brigadier J H Condon met and decided to set up a school in Mussoorie. The school was built at Jabarkhet along the Tehri road and was later shifted to the present Wynberg Estate. The object was to provide for and give to children, wholly or partly of European descent, an education based on Protestant Christian principles; to maintain such children; and to give them an academic and practical training conducive to economic welfare and happiness. It now accommodates students of all descents.

The school consists of two branches—the Junior branch (Wynberg) and the Senior branch (Allen) and accommodates around 700 children. The school has four houses: Allen, Powell, Foy and Condon. A student from the institution is referred to as an "Alwynin."

The Convent of Jesus and Mary, Waverley, Mussoorie was established in 1845 by the Religious Sisters of Jesus and Mary Mussoorie Educational Society.

The school is conducted by the Religious Sisters of Jesus and Mary. It is an all-girls school and perhaps the oldest Convent school in India. The Jesus and Mary congregation was the first congregation of Sisters to come to the north in 1842 at the invitation of Bishop Borghi the Vicar Apostolic of the Agra Mission. The Archbishop requested the sisters to come to Mussoorie to start a school for girls. In 1845 the sisters came to Mussoorie. The estate of Waverley belonging to an Italian gentleman had just come into the market and the nuns bought it. That year saw the commencement of one of the most important Catholic educational institutions in the North of India. Thousands of girls, Catholic and non-Catholic alike, have since passed through Waverley. The small inadequate bungalow which was all the accommodation at first offered, has given place to a group of tastefully conceived buildings which dominate the town of Mussoorie.

Guru Nanak Fifth Centenary School (GNFCS) is another one of Mussoorie's well-known schools and one of the best boarding establishments in India. Previously owned by the Seventh-day Adventists and known from 1922–1969 as Vincent Hill School, GNFCS purchased the land and extensive buildings and founded an international school in the sacred memory of Sri Guru Nanak Dev Ji, on the occasion of His 500th birth anniversary, celebrated in November 1969. The GNFCS prepares students in accordance with the 10+2 formula for school education, for the Indian Certificate of Secondary Education (10 year course) examination and the Indian School Certificate (12 year course) examination.

Other schools in Mussourie include Mussoorie International School (founded in 1984), Mussoorie Modern School, Tibetan Homes, CST Mussoorie and St Clares Convent School.

Mussorie has the Lal Bahadur Shastri National Academy of Administration, the premier training institute for officers of the Indian Foreign Service, Indian Administrative Service and other civil services.

The library area houses the premier academy of the Indo-Tibetan Border Police Force, an elite central police organization belonging to the Government of India. It is a well-respected institute for training ITBP officer recruits patrolling the porous borders. The academy was moved to this location in 1978, consequent upon reorganization of the force, and located at two separate patches of land known as Cainville Estate (Adminb wing) and Astel estate (Combat wing) The academy has grown over the years so as to take friendly foreign countries officers as its trainees. State-of-the-art facilities have been established here in order to provide the latest modern training to its trainees. The academy has a helipad, synthetic tennis courts, modern computer labs and simulators, and one of the best libraries in town.

The Academy also serves the local inhabitants as the first-responder in any major or minor rescue and relief work, be it a traffic accident, or a cable car mishap. ITBP has provided much needed relief immediately. They have been instrumental in assisting the town's local administration in preserving the green cover of this exotic hill station. The Academy is headed by M. C. Bhatt, IG, at present, with Sh Satyendra Kumar as Commandant.

Economy 
The economy in Mussoorie is primarily dependent on tourism. Tourists come primarily from New Delhi, Punjab, Haryana, Uttar Pradesh and other northern states. In Mussoorie itself, there were  domestic tourist arrivals and 1865 foreign arrivals in 2017. There is a projected 58.5% growth forecast in foreign tourist arrivals due to EVisa nationally. Educational institutions are another contributor to the local economy. The Uttarakhand Government has created investment proposals for the development of a mountain forest resort and a development of ropeways in order to boost tourism in the region.

Transport
Mussoorie is connected by road to Delhi and major cities. It is called the "Gateway" to Yamunotri and Gangotri shrines of Northern India. Within Mussoorie are taxis and buses. A ropeway between Purkul Gaon, Dehradun and Mussoorie is in the works. This rope way is projected to reduce traffic congestion and increase tourist footfall to Mussoorie.

Notable people
Ruskin Bond
Tom Alter
Anita Desai
Saira Banu
Jamila Gavin
Stephen Alter
Nayantara Sahgal
Martha Chen
Victor Banerjee
Saeed Jaffrey

References

External links

 An engraving of a painting by Thomas Colman Dibdin with a poetical illustration bt Letitia Elizabeth Landon in Fisher's Drawing Room Scrap Book, 1838.
 Mussoorie on official website of Dehradun district

 
Cities and towns in Dehradun district
Hill stations in Uttarakhand
Tibetan diaspora in India
Tourism in Uttarakhand
Tourist attractions in Dehradun
Articles containing video clips